Hazlehurst station is an Amtrak intercity train station in Hazlehurst, Mississippi, United States, served by the City of New Orleans passenger train. The station, an unstaffed flag stop, consists of  a single platform with a small shelter, located next to the old Illinois Central Railroad Depot, which was built in 1925 and is now occupied by the Hazlehurst Depot Museum.

References

External links 

Hazelhurst Amtrak Station (USA Rail Guide -- Train Web)

Amtrak stations in Mississippi
Railway stations on the National Register of Historic Places in Mississippi
Railway stations in the United States opened in 1925
Former Illinois Central Railroad stations
Railroad museums in Mississippi
Education in Copiah County, Mississippi
National Register of Historic Places in Copiah County, Mississippi